This is a list of notable events in the history of LGBT rights that took place in the year 1975.

Events
Milton Shapp, governor of the U.S. state of Pennsylvania, issues the first state executive order banning sexual orientation employment discrimination by the government.

January
7 — A Maricopa County, Arizona county clerk issues a marriage license to a same-sex couple.

February
 The first gay-oriented television commercial airs on two Washington, D.C. stations. Lambda Rising bookstore sponsored the ads on episodes of Phil Donahue and Marcus Welby, M.D.. Stations balked at airing the ads, but relented after getting approval from the Association of Broadcasters Standards office.

March
 26 — Boulder County, Colorado clerk Clela Rorex begins issuing marriage licenses to same-sex couples. Colorado Attorney General J.D. MacFarlane later issues an opinion that the licenses are invalid and orders that no additional licenses be issued.

July
 1 — The U.S. states of California and Washington decriminalize private consensual adult homosexual acts.
 3 — The United States Civil Service Commission ends its policy of automatically disqualifying gay and lesbian applicants.

Deaths
 February 10 — Lige Clarke, LGBT rights activist and journalist. Murdered in Vera Cruz, Mexico.

See also

Timeline of LGBT history — timeline of events from 12,000 BCE to present
LGBT rights by country or territory — current legal status around the world
LGBT social movements

References

LGBT rights by year
1975 in LGBT history